Diarmuid Ó Gráinne (10 May 1950  – 28 August 2013) was an Irish-language writer and journalist from the County Galway Gaeltacht. He wrote for the newspaper, Lá and featured on Raidió na Gaeltachta. He released a number of books, perhaps best known works are his semi-autobiographical novel writings An Traimp and Muintir na Coille.

Ó Gráinne was strongly influenced by his fellow Connemara-man, Máirtín Ó Cadhain whose death he felt left a hole in the leadership of the Irish-language movement. Ó Gráinne also took an interest in some Continental European authors, translating writings by or autobiographies about Karl Marx, Albert Camus and Friedrich Nietzsche into Irish.

Bibliography

Criticism
An Dá Mháirtín (Comhar: 1990)

Novels
An Traimp (Cló Iar-Chonnacht: 1991)
Brionglóidí briste (An Clóchomhar Teoranta: 1991)
 Cloch Scoiltí (Coiscéim: 2002)
 An Drochshúil (Coiscéim: 2002) 
 Muintir na Coille (Coiscéim: 2011)

Poetry
Spéir thoirní (Coiscéim: 1993)
Spealadh an drúchta (Coiscéim: 1995)
Coill chríon na bhForbacha (Coiscéim: 2001)

Short-stories
Céard a dhéanfas tú anois? (Coiscéim: 1997)

Philosophy
Ó Rinn go Sáil, I (Coiscéim: 2010)
Ó Rinn go Sáil, II (Coiscéim: 2012)
Ó Rinn go Sáil, III (Coiscéim: 2013)

Miscellaneous
 Karl Marx (Coiscéim: 1993) translation of Caroline Seaward
 A scéal féin – Máire Phatch Mhóir Uí Churraoin (Coiscéim: 1995)
 Peait Phádraic Tom Ó Conghaile – A scéal féin (Coiscéim: 1997)
 Friedrich Nietzsche: Saol agus smaointeachas (Coiscéim: 1997)
 Doirse éalaithe (Coiscéim: 2004)
 Fágann marbh láthair (Coiscéim: 2006)
 An dorn iata (Coiscéim: 2007)
 Cúba agus Castró (Coiscéim: 2009)
 An Strainséara (Coiscéim: 2012) translation of L’Étranger by Albert Camus

External links
Diarmuid Ó Gráinne at Writing.ie
Ó Gráinne, Diarmuid at Ainm.ie

1950 births
2013 deaths
20th-century Irish writers
20th-century male writers
21st-century Irish writers
21st-century Irish male writers
People from County Galway
Irish-language writers